Velenjak is an affluent neighbourhood in the northwest of Tehran, Iran. Velenjak (Also Called Roof of Tehran) is located in the Shemiran area in the northernmost part of Tehran, on the slopes of the Alborz mountain range. It is known for its landscapes, mild climate, mountain air, springs, and wildlife.

Velenjak houses many foreign residents, particularly people of South Korean descent who work in the finance and industrial firms throughout Tehran. Many embassies are located in Velenjak, including the embassies of Brunei, Côte d'Ivoire, Malaysia, Serbia and Montenegro, Algeria, and numerous ambassadorial residences. Shahid Beheshti University and Shahid Beheshti University of Medical Sciences, are also located in this area.

Beheshti University is located in Velenjak. It is known for its engineering program. The university also has Natural Sciences, Humanities, and Social Science programs.

Culture

Mode and fashion 
People of Velenjak usually follow the fashion of the world rather than the fashion of Iran. Also, This neighborhood has hosted many Iranian fashion events.

Food 
This neighborhood is a great place to enjoy Iranian food. There are many high-end cafes and restaurants in Velenjak, both modern and classic, serving both Iranian and cosmopolitan cuisine.

Sports 

There are many modern sports facilities in Velenjak but Tochal Complex is known as the neighborhood's most popular sports venue. Velenjak is located adjacent to the Tochal Complex, a ski resort area with a gondola lift up to Mount Tochal. Tochal is one of biggest tourist destinations in Alborz Mountain adjacent to Velenjak. People walk up Tochal during the night time, it has many restaurants and coffee shops, with views of the city from the top.

Music 
The singer Benyamin Bahadori has stated that he is from Velenjak in an interview with Radio Javan.

See also 

 Tochal
 Saadat Abad
 Almahdi
 Elahiyeh
 Qolhak

References 

 http://www.tageo.com/index-e-ir-v-26-d-534187.htm
 http://iran.places-in-the-world.com/8449641-place-velenjak-north.html
 http://www.priceiran.com/house-price-iran/
 http://triptopersia.com/iran-practical-guides/dress-code
 http://www.travelwithpedro.com/tehran-part-1-most-famous-landmark/

External links 

 velenjak-kojast.ir

Neighbourhoods in Tehran
Diplomatic districts